The Hardenburgh Avenue Bridge is located in Demarest, Bergen County, New Jersey, United States. The bridge was built in 1875 to traverse the Tenakill Brook and was added to the National Register of Historic Places on March 12, 2001.

See also 
National Register of Historic Places listings in Bergen County, New Jersey
List of bridges on the National Register of Historic Places in New Jersey

References

External links
 Google Street View of Hardenburgh Avenue Bridge

Road bridges on the National Register of Historic Places in New Jersey
Bridges completed in 1875
Bridges in Bergen County, New Jersey
Demarest, New Jersey
National Register of Historic Places in Bergen County, New Jersey
New Jersey Register of Historic Places
Stone bridges in the United States